Sergey Aleksandrovich Golovkin (26 November 1959 — 2 August 1996) was a Soviet-Russian serial killer, rapist and necrophile, convicted for the killing of 11 boys between the ages of 10 and 16 in the Moscow area between 1986 and 1992. Golovkin, also known as The Fisher and The Boa, tortured, raped and killed young boys in his garage basement and the forests outside Moscow.

Golovkin was the last person to be executed in Russia before the abolition of capital punishment.

Background
Sergey Aleksandrovich Golovkin was born on 26 November 1959, in Moscow, Soviet Union. His father was an alcoholic, and his parents divorced in 1988. Golovkin was born with a birth defect in his sternum. He often had bronchitis and indigestion. In school, Golovkin was considered a loner, and his male classmates noted how he had no interest in girls. He was known to have enuresis, and was afraid that his classmates would smell his urine. Golovkin was a classmate of Armen Grigoryan, the future front-man of Krematorij. When Golovkin was 13 years old he began to exhibit sadistic tendencies, including catching a cat in the street and bringing it home, where he hanged it and then decapitated it.

In 1982, Golovkin graduated from the Timiryazev Agricultural Academy. He began working at a racetrack, then as a livestock expert at a stud farm in Moscow. For his achievements in horse breeding development, Golovkin was awarded a silver medal at a VDNKh trade show in 1989.

In 1984, Golovkin committed his first known crime, when he attempted to rape and murder a young boy.

Murders

Moscow Oblast killings

In April 1986, Golovkin committed his first murder, near the Katuar railway station in Nekrasov, Moscow Oblast, just outside of Moscow. He met 15-year-old Andrey Pavlov, who Golovkin then threatened with a knife and dragged into the forest. Pavlov was raped, strangled to death and Golovkin performed necrophilia on the body.

The following July, Golovkin committed his second murder, abducting 12-year-old Andrey Gulyaev from a summer camp near Odintsovo, Moscow Oblast. Gulyaev was also threatened with a knife, taken to the forest, then raped and strangled before Golovkin dismembered the body.

Four days later after Gulyaev's murder, the dead body of a 16-year old was found in Odintsovsky District. A total of 35 stab wounds were found on the body. The corpse was dismembered. Later, Golovkin denied any guilt in this murder.

Garage murders
In 1988, Golovkin purchased a beige-colored VAZ-2103 car, which he stored in his garage where he began constructing a basement, originally to be used as a workshop; however, he realized it could be used as a dungeon to commit his sexual crimes. From August 1990, Golovkin killed eight boys aged 10 to 16 years old; on two occasions torturing two boys at the same time. In September 1992, Golovkin raped and killed three boys he had lured into his garage, offering to commit theft from a warehouse. The last of them Golovkin tortured and raped for 12 hours and then hung up before he went to work.

Arrest and conviction
On October 5, 1992, three weeks after the last murders, the bodies of the final three victims were found by mushroom pickers. On October 19, 1992, Golovkin was detained under suspicion by the police. During the interrogation he behaved calmly and denied guilt. Investigators Kostaryov and Bakin decided to release Golovkin, instead setting up a secret surveillance on him; however, a policeman violated the order and put Golovkin in solitary confinement for the night. In the morning Golovkin was questioned, and confessed the last three murders to Kostaryov. The next day police searched Golovkin's garage, discovering a baby bath with a burnt layer of skin and blood, clothes, and body parts. Golovkin then confessed to a total of 11 murders, revealing where he had disposed of the bodies of his victims.

Golovkin was found to be sane but with a schizoid disorder, and on 19 October 1994, Golovkin was sentenced to death.

On 2 August 1996, Golovkin was executed by a single shot to the back of the head. He was the last person to be executed by Russia before the abolition of capital punishment.

See also
 List of Russian serial killers
 List of serial killers by number of victims

References

External links 
 Фишер — подробное исследование жизни Головкина

1959 births
1996 deaths
20th-century executions by Russia
20th-century Russian LGBT people
Executed people from Moscow
Executed Soviet serial killers
Male serial killers
Necrophiles
People convicted of murder by Russia
People executed by Russia by firearm
People with schizoid personality disorder
Russian murderers of children
Russian people convicted of child sexual abuse
Russian people convicted of murder
Russian people executed by Russia
Russian rapists
Russian serial killers
Soviet rapists
Torture in Russia
Violence against men in Europe
Incidents of violence against boys